Baron Alexander Wassilko von Serecki (December 17, 1827, Berhometh, Austria – August 20, 1893, Lopuszna (Lăpușna), Austria-Hungary), descendant of an old Moldavian boyar family, was an Austro-Hungarian ethnic Romanian statesman, Landeshauptmann of the Duchy of Bukovina and member of the Herrenhaus, the Upper House of the Imperial Council of Austria.

Activity 
After completing his baccalaureate in 1846, Alexander studied philosophy and jurisprudence at the universities of Czernowitz and Lemberg. Since 1850 he worked as a lawyer in Czernowitz and after 1859 he managed his father's Baron Jordaki estates.

Alexander became a member of the "Autonomist Romanian Conservative Party" and began his political career in 1862, when he was elected as one of their representatives in the Council (Diet) of Bukovina.

In 1863 the Baron cofounded the society "Junimea", the most influential intellectual, cultural and political Romanian union of the 19th century. He continued to support it and later became an honorary member.

On February 24, 1867, the Emperor Franz Josef designated him to succeed his father as member in the Herrenhaus, the Upper House of the Imperial Parliament in Vienna in 1867. He was the only representative of the Duchy of Bukovina in this chamber for thirteen years. Finally, in 1880, the metropolitan of Bukovina and Dalmatia Sylvester Morariu-Andriewicz, also became a member of this institution.

From 1870 to 1871 and again from 1884 to 1892, he assumed the position of Governor of the Duchy of Bukovina. He attracted considerable attention, because he campaigned, along with other members of his parliament (including Hormuzaki, Costin, Flondor) successfully campaigned in
Vienna for the limitation of the monopoly and autocracy of the Eastern Orthodox Church.

Due to his relationship with the Viennese court he also achieved, that in 1876 the Romanian language was approved as language of instruction at the Lyceum of Suczawa. The permission to teach in Romanian in special high school classes in Czernowitz followed several years later.

He also insisted, despite his leading position in the federal faction of the Romanian aristocracy and as Governor of Bukovina, that all citizens had the right to freely exercise their own religion and culture, and to have their mother tongue recognized, but always under the auspices of the Habsburg monarchy and the leadership of the Emperor. After the Kingdom of Romania was founded in 1881, Alexander proved to be a resolute opponent of the growing number of proponents for a connection of the Bucovina with Romania. In his opening speech as governor given in German language in the Bukovina Parliament on July 22, 1884, he called on all parliamentarians, to proceed unanimously in upholding provincial autonomy within the concept of an Austrian state. He also campaigned for the legal recognition of the German, Romanian and Ruthenian languages, stressing that the German language was the common bond of all the peoples in the monarchy. These have evolved historically and factually as the only official language, and is therefore to be ruled by them. He was considered an early pioneer of the idea of a United Europe of Nations.

In 1885 His Imperial and Royal Apostolic Majesty awarded the baron the  Order of the Iron Crown 2nd class and, in 1888, on the occasion of his reappointment as governor, the rank of a "Real Privy Councillor".

His unexpected death in 1893 led to "deep dismay and sadness" in the population, and among his political friends and enemies.

Family

Alexander was the son of Baron Iordaki (b. March 4, 1795, Castle Berhometh; d.  November 6, 1861, ibidem) and his wife, Pulcheria Kalmuţchi (b. November 3, 1811, in Rohozna, Bukovina; d. August 22, 1895, in Czernowitz). On June 16, 1859, at Castle Hlinița, he married Katharina (b. July 21, 1843, at Hlinița Castle, d. December 27, 1920, at Mihowa Castle), the daughter of a landowner and owner of Hlinița-Castle, Jordaki Ritter von Flondor (1798-1868). The marriage resulted in four sons: 
 Georg (1864-1940) also Austro-Hungarian statesman (Governor) of the Duchy of Bucovina, 
 Stephan (b. June 10, 1869, Berhometh; d. August 31, 1933, Salzburg), Officer and Ministerial Counsellor in the Ministry of the Interior,
 Alexander (b. February 2, 1871, Berhometh Castle; d. July 21, 1920, Bârlad), Chamberlain of the Archduke Henry Ferdinand of Habsburg-Toscana, Lieutenant-Colonel and Deputy Head of the Evidenzbureau. His wife mother Eva baroness von Rolsberg was the granddaughter of Feldzeugmeister Wilhelm Lenk von Wolfsberg.  
 Viktor (b. May 19, 1872, auf Berhometh Castle; d. July 13, 1934, Czernowitz), orthodox military priest, than archdeacon and Exarch in Vienna.

Emperor Charles I of Austria appointed them with the title of "Kämmerer" of the empire in 1905, and on August 29, 1918 (Diploma of October 19 of the year) to Austrian Counts Wassilko von Serecki. In 1907 the family was named hereditary member of the Upper House of the Austrian Imperial Council.

Possessions
He was by far the largest landowner in Bukovina (28 000 hectares) and one of the largest in the Austria-Hungarian Empire. Because his brothers died childless, Emperor Franz Joseph I,  with the consent of both Houses of the Imperial Parliament, approved him in 1888 to establish and guide a "Realfideikommisss".

In order to advance the state of agriculture on his property he founded two villages named after himself and his wife:"Alexanderdorf" (1863) and "Katharinendorf" (1869). There he settled German-Lutheran farmers from the area and from Galicia. In both places he built German schools (1870 and 1875). Settler families had to pay small, regular fees for their maintenance. Because the closest Lutheran Church was 70 km away, in Czernowitz, he established a Lutheran church for the two villages.

The Baron acquired the 1886 "Wassilko-Palais", a building at Herrengasse No. 38, in Czernowitz. He also completed the construction of "Berhometh Castle",  that had been destroyed by fire in the Russian offensive of 1915, during the First World War, in. In 1889 the Baron also ordered the building of a new church in Berhometh.
In 1924 the "Wassilkogasse" in Czernowitz, a side street of the "Herrengasse" named after the family, was renamed, to honour him. The German-Jewish author Paul Celan grew up on this street, in number No. 5.

Notes

References
 Justus Perthes: Die Gothaschen Genealogischen Taschenbücher des Adels S-Z, GB 1919, S. 606.
 Justus Perthes: Gothaisches Genealogisches Taschenbuch der Gräflichen Häuser, Teil B, Perthes, 1868, 114. Jahrgang 1941, S. 536-537. 
 Ion Nistor: Istoria Bucovinei, Ed. Humanitas, Bukarest, 1991, S. 128, S. 260, in rumänischer Sprache
 Erich Prokopowitsch: Der Adel in der Bukowina, Südostdeutscher Verlag, München, 1983, S. 141-147 
 Almanach der Zeitschrift für Literatur Junimea, Iaşi, 1926.
 Ion Drăguşanul: Bucovina faptului divers, Vol. 1,2, Editura Bucovina Viitoare, Suceava, 2002.

External links 

1827 births
1893 deaths
People from Chernivtsi Oblast
People from the Kingdom of Galicia and Lodomeria
19th-century Romanian politicians
Barons of Austria
Royalty and nobility of Austria-Hungary
Romanian nobility
Ethnic Romanian politicians in Bukovina
19th-century Austrian politicians